Chain Reaction is an American television game show created by Bob Stewart, in which players compete to form chains composed of two-word phrases.

The show has aired five separate runs: Bill Cullen hosted the original series on NBC from January 14, 1980, to June 20, 1980. The second version aired on the USA Network from September 29, 1986, to December 27, 1991, and was hosted first by Blake Emmons and later by Geoff Edwards (who also subbed for Cullen for two weeks on the NBC version). A third version aired on Game Show Network from August 1, 2006, to June 9, 2007, hosted by Dylan Lane. A fourth version, also on GSN, was announced on January 26, 2015, with Vincent Rubino as executive producer and hosted by Mike Catherwood. Forty episodes were ordered for Catherwood's version, which aired from July 16, 2015, to January 29, 2016. The fifth and current version, also on GSN, was announced in November 2020, with Mike Richards as executive producer, Ed Egan as showrunner and Lane returning as host; it premiered on February 22, 2021.

Overview
The game is centered around solving a word-chain puzzle. In 1980, the chain comprised eight words. From 1986 to 2016, it comprised seven words, and in 2021, it comprised six words for the first three rounds and seven in the fourth. The words in the chain are linguistically or logically connected, with both the word at the top and the word at the bottom revealed on the outset. 

By making inferences based on the revealed words and the revealed letters in incomplete words, contestants try to fill in the word chains to score points (dollars on Game Show Network). From 1980 to 1991, the team/player that reached the point goal first won the game. Since 2006, the team with the highest money total after the fourth round wins the game; a team can also win the game if at any time their opponents' money total is reduced to zero during the fourth round. Except from 1990 to 1991, the winning team/player then played the bonus round, which would vary depending on the series.

NBC

The first version of the show aired for 23 weeks from January 14, 1980, to June 20, 1980, on NBC and was hosted by Bill Cullen, except for two weeks when Geoff Edwards hosted while Cullen was filling in for Allen Ludden on Password Plus. (At that time, Edwards was also hosting Barry-Enright's Play the Percentages). The announcer was Johnny Gilbert. It aired at 12:00 noon ET/11:00 AM CT/MT/PT, facing out CBS' The Young and the Restless for the first three weeks, and ABC's The $20,000 Pyramid; however, many affiliates aired local news at that timeslot, preempting Chain Reaction. The show was one of three game shows, the others being High Rollers and Hollywood Squares, which were canceled in June 1980 to make room for the 90-minute talk show The David Letterman Show.

Repeats of this version aired for several years on cable, first on CBN Cable from March 29, 1982, to May 4, 1984, then later on the USA Network from September 30, 1985, to the debut of the new version that originated in Canada. GSN aired reruns of this version from October 1997 to April 1998.

Main game
Two teams of three competed in each game. A team consisted of one contestant and two celebrity guests. The teams were shown the beginning and ending words of an eight-word chain. Each word is related to the word above it and below it; the connection could be either a word association or a phrase. A sample chain could be:

TWISTANKLEBRACELETCHAINGANGWARSTRATEGYCHESS

The challenging team began the game. In the event two new players were competing, a coin toss determined which team went first. Usually, the challengers were the blue team and the champions were the gold team.

As the game continued, the words would be revealed one letter at a time. A player's turn consisted of calling for a letter in the next word above or below one of the already revealed words and then guessing the word (note that the last letter of each word is not revealed). A correct response won one point for each letter in the word (two if the word had a '+' mark next to it) and that team kept control of the board. If the player in control was incorrect or gave no guess, control went back to the other team. The game continued until either one team scored 50 points, or the chain was finished. If that happened, another chain was put up and the game continued until one team reached the goal of 50 points, any letters exceeding 50 points are not included in the player's score. That team's contestant won the game, $250 (later dropped when the final version of the endgame was introduced) and the right to play for $10,000 in the bonus round. The losing player received $5 a point for playing (changed to parting gifts with the third endgame).

Instant Reaction
In the bonus round, the two celebrities from the winning team attempted to get the contestant to guess a series of words or phrases by constructing a question one word at a time. The celebrities alternated giving words to construct the question, then hit a bell signaling the contestant to respond. Cash was awarded to the contestant for every correct response.

In the first format (which only lasted the first week of the series), the team was staked with $1 and had a 60-second time limit. Each correct response added one half of a zero behind the $1, meaning that after two correct responses the player would win $10, after four the player would win $100, and so on up to the $10,000 maximum.

For the next four weeks, the time limit was increased to 90 seconds, and the first correct response was worth $1, with the next three each adding a zero behind it. At that point, the contestant's winnings would be $1,000 and the next four correct responses each added $1,000 to their total. The ninth overall correct response augmented their total to $10,000.

The third format had the same time limit, but each of the first nine correct responses was now worth $100, and the tenth correct response increased the contestant's winnings to $10,000. After two weeks, the format was slightly modified so that the contestant was staked with $100 at the start of the round, thus reducing the number of correct answers needed for a $10,000 win to nine.

If at any point a contestant provided an incorrect response, a celebrity gave two words in succession, accidentally gave part of the answer, or passed the word, the word was thrown out and gameplay continued to the next word.

Champions remained on the show until they were defeated or until they won ten matches.

Stewart later developed and expanded the bonus round of Chain Reaction into the game show Go.

Still later, "Instant Reaction" was revived as the bonus round on the first Dylan Lane-hosted version of Chain Reaction.

USA/Global

The second version of Chain Reaction premiered in 1986, airing on the Global Television Network in Canada and the USA Network in the United States. Blake Emmons hosted the show for a few weeks before being replaced by Geoff Edwards (although USA started the season by airing several weeks of Edwards episodes, then showing Emmons' reign; Edwards has had experience having hosted two weeks of the NBC version, subbing for then-regular host Bill Cullen). Rod Charlebois served as co-host/announcer, who presented the "home game" for the viewing audience (Emmons presented the home game by himself during his time as host). Charlebois was a local radio and television personality at CFCF radio and CFCF-TV in Montreal, Quebec, Canada, where the USA version was taped. Charlebois was given an on-air role for most of the show's run, due to Cancon laws which required American shows taping in Canada to feature at least one Canadian personality on-air. Global aired reruns of this version through the mid-1990s, while GSN aired reruns for a brief period in late 1997.

Reruns of neither this version nor the NBC version have aired since the premiere of Dylan Lane's first version in 2006.

Main game
Each chain comprised seven words. The teams were reduced to two civilian players each and each was given one responsibility. One teammate was the letter giver and decided whether to give a letter to his or her partner or the other team's word guesser. As before, a correct response was worth points and control of the board. In round one, each word guessed was worth 10 points, but the final word guessed in that chain was worth 20 (changed to 15 in season two). In round two, these values escalated to 20 points each and 40 points for the final word. If a fourth chain was needed to decide the game, the point values were 40 points per word and 80 for the final word. The first team to score 200 points won the game. That team played the bonus game and returned to the next show.

During the run, two methods of earning bonus money were used. In the first season, the middle word of the second chain was also a bonus word (designated first by an asterisk, then by a dollar sign) worth $250 for the team that guessed it. For seasons two to four, the players played a Missing Link. The team in the lead would be shown the first and last words of a three-word chain. If they could guess the word in between with no letters revealed, the team received $500. Every wrong guess added a letter while taking away $100 from the potential payoff.

For seasons three and four, only solo players participated and a score of 300 won the game. The players now had to decide whether to take a letter for themselves or give one to their opponent.

Champions remained on the show until they were defeated or held their title for five consecutive days. During the first season, any team that retired undefeated received a $5,000 bonus.

Bonus chain
The winning team/player could collect a cash jackpot by completing one last word chain. The team/player was shown the first word in a chain and the initial letter of the other words. One at a time, the player(s) would guess at the next word in the chain. For each wrong guess, the next letter would be filled in and a letter deducted from their account. If the team could finish the chain before running out of letters the team won the cash jackpot. If not, they (or he/she) won $100 per word, including the one at the top. The jackpot began at $3,000 ($2,000 with the solo players) and $1,000 was added each day it was not claimed. The highest pot was $16,000. While Emmons was host the account was nine letters. When Geoff Edwards took over it was lowered to seven. During season one, if there was extra time afterward, another bonus round was played, this time worth $1,000 for the team's favorite charity.

The bonus chain was removed in season five because the end of season four had an elimination tournament of champions, where the sixteen top winners of seasons three and four returned in a tournament format (sixteen players reduced to eight, then down to four and then down to two). The final winner of the final game won $20,000 and the runner-up won $2,000. Games were all played to 500 points.

The $40,000 Chain Reaction
On New Year's Eve 1990, the show was revamped with a tournament format featuring 128 players competing for $40,000. The game was played as before, but there was no bonus chain and two new players competed in each show. The values for each chain remained the same, but if a fifth chain was needed, the point values were 50 points per word and 100 for the final word. In the event of a game ending with only four chains played, co-host Charlebois would play the fifth chain against the day's winner.

Eight players competed on the first four shows. After four days, those four winners played two each for the next two days. Those two winners played on the seventh day and the winner of that game won $7,500.

The player who led after the second chain got to play a Missing Link for $300. The Missing Link changed its format as well. After the change, the first letter of the middle word was given, the first letter was worth $300 and subsequent letters reduced the value by $100.

After sixteen $7,500 tournaments were played, those 16 players played in a single-elimination tournament. The semi-finals were double-elimination and the two players remaining played one game for $40,000.

Home game
Each day, before closing the show, Charlebois would present the answer to yesterday's home game and the current game. The home game consisted of a Missing Link (see above) and was actually referred to as such during the first season, but later renamed simply "the home game" when this format was adapted as the new round two mini-bonus in the second season. The home game first started while Emmons was still hosting; he presented the home game alone and encouraged viewers to write the chains down on a piece of paper. Charlebois didn't start coming onto the stage to present the home game until Edwards took over the hosting duties.

GSN
A new version of the show debuted on August 1, 2006, on GSN. This version was hosted by Dylan Lane and produced by Michael Davies' production company Embassy Row. Seasons one and two were taped at the Sony Music Studios in New York City. GSN began airing the second season on March 13, 2007 and ended on June 9, 2007.

Each team consisted of three people of the same gender (except for one week in which the teams consisted of three teachers against three students from the same school). The bonus round was simply a revival of the original bonus round from 1980.

A second GSN version was commissioned in January 2015, with the new 40-episode season featuring Vincent Rubino as executive producer and Mike Catherwood of the nationally syndicated Loveline radio program as the host. It debuted on July 16, 2015. This version is the same as the previous version, minus the Speed Chains and with two contestants on each team; the bonus round is nearly identical to the Edwards/Emmons version.

The current version was ordered in November 2020, premiering on February 22, 2021, with Mike Richards as executive producer, Ed Egan as showrunner, and Lane returning as host. Teams are back to three contestants each, and the Speed Chains from the first GSN version have been brought back. The bonus round is a timed variation of the main game where the winning team has 60 seconds to complete three chains. The set resurrects the blue and gold color scheme of the NBC version.

Main game
There are four chains in the main game (not counting the Speed Chains). The gameplay is similar to the NBC and USA/Global versions, except that the words in the chain are now always two-word phrases or compound words. In the first season of the 2006-2007 version, the final letter of a word would be revealed (though the fact that it was the final letter was not announced, and sometimes was not evident). At that point, if the team did not guess the word correctly, the word was revealed and neither team received the money. Since the second season of the 2006-2007 version, the last letter is not revealed (as in the 1980 and 1986-1991 versions), although a shuffling placeholder (or a blank space in Catherwood's version) is shown in place of the last letter. If the word was not correctly guessed, the other team had a chance to either guess that word or choose a different space but did not receive another letter.

In round one, each correct word is worth $100, round two words are worth $200 and words in round three are worth $300. Whichever team was behind going into a round started the next round (in the event of a tie, the team who did not start the last chain started the next chain). In the first two GSN runs, all chains that were not Speed Chains were seven-word chains. In the 2021 version, the first three rounds are each played with a six-word chain.

In the fourth round, each team is required to wager between $100 and $500 of their bank before being given their letter. If correct, they win their bet and keep control, if not, the amount of the bet is deducted and they lose control (or lose the game if they wagered the entire bankroll). In the 2021 version, the fourth round is the only round played with a seven-word chain, with wagers between $100 and $500, except a team can now wager up to $1,000 once there is only one word left to be revealed in the chain.

A team can win the game if either they are ahead after the fourth round, or if at any time the other team's bankroll is reduced to zero. In the event of a tie at the end of the fourth round, the Tiebreaker is played.

Speed chain
Except when Catherwood hosted, after each of the first three rounds, whichever team correctly identified the final word to complete the chain was allowed to complete a four-word Speed Chain with the first letter of the middle two words given. An example could be:

HALFB___ (BAKED)A___ (ALASKA)PIPELINE

The team has seven seconds to confer and come up with the two words. If correct, they won the same value as a single correct word in the previous round ($100–$300). If neither team completed the chain, neither team got to play the speed chain. The 2015 version eliminated the speed chains, except for the Tiebreaker. The speed chains after the first three rounds returned for the 2021 version. Going into the first commercial break in the 2021 version, a three-word chain with the middle word missing was shown for home viewers (as in the USA/Global version, when they were presented at the end of each episode), with the answer revealed coming out of the commercial break.

Tiebreaker
In the 2006 and 2015 versions, if the fourth round ended in a tie, the teams were given alternating Speed Chains in a "sudden death" format. If one team did not solve their Speed Chain, the other team need only solve their next Speed Chain to win the game. Both teams kept their money, and the losing team received unacknowledged parting gifts as well.

In the 2021 version, the Tiebreaker uses only one Speed Chain. The team that went first in the fourth round has the option to play the Speed Chain or pass it to the other team. The tiebreaking Speed Chain is played in the same manner as after each of the first three rounds of regulation play (including the seven-second conference). If the team playing the Speed Chain successfully solves the chain, that team wins the game. If not, the other team automatically wins.

Bonus Round
The winning team then advances to the bonus round, which was different for each version.

2006-2007 ("Instant Reaction" revival)
For Lane's first series, the bonus round was a revival of "Instant Reaction" from the NBC version. The first two members gave clues by building questions, alternating one word at a time. If either clue giver gave more than one word in a row, built a clue that was not loosely in the form of a question, or said part of the answer, the clue givers had to move on to the next word. The third player could not see the answers but had to ring in to guess the answer to the question his/her partners were constructing. Once the guesser rang in, no more clues may be given on that word. Any team member could also pass as often as possible to throw out the current word.

Season one
In the first season, the team was given 90 seconds to go through as many as 20 words. The player setup was the same as in 1980 except:
 The table was now much smaller.
 The team now stood at the table instead of sitting.
 All three members of the team now had their hands over the bell - now a standard call bell - at all times. (On the NBC version, the clue-giver that gave the last word to finish the question reached over and pressed a raised button in front of the guesser to ring the bell.)
 Because of the smaller table, the guesser was now blindfolded.

In the first 30 episodes, if a team got seven correct answers, they would double their money from the main game; if they got ten correct, the main game winnings were tripled. For the following 35 episodes, the requirements were reduced to only five and seven correct answers, respectively.

Season two
A new format was introduced for season two. The guesser sat in a chair with his/her back to the clue-givers and held a signaling button to ring in. When the guesser rang in, the clock stopped for up to three seconds while the guesser gave his/her answer. If the team guessed five correct answers in 60 seconds, they earned an additional $5,000. If not, they were given $100 for each correct answer.

2015 (Superchain)
In Catherwood's endgame, the winning team had 45 seconds to guess seven more words. To start, a keyword was given, the seven words involved connect to that word. Then on each word, the first three letters were given one at a time. A correct answer moved on to the next word. The team could pass on a word if they were stuck and then must go back to it if there was time left on the clock. Guessing all seven words correctly won $5,000.

2021 (Three Final Chains)
The 2021 version's bonus round is a timed variation of the main game, in which the winning team must complete three final chains—of four, five, and six words, in that order—within 60 seconds. In turn, each player calls for a letter below the top word or above the bottom word, and then attempts to guess that word; control then passes to the next player, whether the guess is correct or not. The clock stops when each chain is completed. A team that completes all three chains (nine words total) in time wins an additional $10,000.

International versions

* Aired in both the U.S. and Canada for both audiences/players.** Edwards filled in for two weeks while Cullen was filling in for an ill Allen Ludden on Password Plus.

References

External links
 
 Chain Reaction (1980)/(1986–1991) on IMDb
 Chain Reaction (2006) on IMDb
 Chain Reaction (2015) on IMDb
 Chain Reaction at Embassy Row

1980 American television series debuts
1980 American television series endings
1980s American game shows
1986 American television series debuts
1990s American game shows
1991 American television series endings
2000s American game shows
2006 American television series debuts
2007 American television series endings
2010s American game shows
2015 American television series debuts
2016 American television series endings
2020s American game shows
2021 American television series debuts
English-language television shows
Game Show Network original programming
NBC original programming
Television series by Bob Stewart Productions
Television series by Embassy Row (production company)
Television series by Sony Pictures Television
Television shows filmed in Montreal
American television series revived after cancellation
USA Network original programming